Josip Torbar (24 June 1922 – 6 July 2013 ) was a Croatian politician.

Torbar was born in Zagreb. He left Yugoslavia in 1945, not returning until the fall of communism. From 1980 to 1988, he was vice-president of the central committee of the Croatian Peasant Party. After the death of Juraj Krnjević, he served as president of the central committee until 1991. Torbar was elected to the Croatian Parliament in the 2000 elections. He was a member of the Parliamentary Assembly of the Council of Europe from 2002 to 2004.

Torbar was an honorary president of the Croatian Peasant Party.

References

1922 births
2013 deaths
Croatian Peasant Party politicians
Representatives in the modern Croatian Parliament
Politicians from Zagreb
Yugoslav expatriates